The PGA Championship (often referred to as the US PGA Championship or USPGA outside the United States) is an annual golf tournament conducted by the Professional Golfers' Association of America. It is one of the four men's major championships in professional golf.

It was formerly played in mid-August on the third weekend before Labor Day weekend, serving as the fourth and final men's major of the golf season. Beginning in 2019, the tournament is played in May on the weekend before Memorial Day, as the season's second major following the Masters Tournament in April. It is an official money event on the PGA Tour, European Tour, and Japan Golf Tour, with a purse of $11 million for the 100th edition in 2018.

In line with the other majors, winning the PGA gains privileges that improve career security. PGA champions are automatically invited to play in the other three majors (Masters Tournament, U.S. Open, and The Open Championship) and The Players Championship for the next five years, and are eligible for the PGA Championship for life. They receive membership on the PGA Tour for the following five seasons and on the European Tour for the following seven seasons. The PGA Championship is the only one of the four majors that is exclusively for professional players.

The PGA Championship has been held at various venues. Some of the early sites are now quite obscure, but in recent years, the event has generally been played at a small group of celebrated courses.

History

In 1894, with 41 golf courses operating in the United States, two unofficial national championships for amateur golfers were organized. One was held at Newport Country Club in Rhode Island, and the other at St. Andrew's Golf Club in New York. In addition, and at the same time as the amateur event, St. Andrew's conducted an Open championship for professional golfers. None of the championships was officially sanctioned by a governing body for American golf, causing considerable controversy among players and organizers. Later in 1894 this led to the formation of the United States Golf Association (USGA), which became the first formal golf organization in the country. After the formation of the USGA, golf quickly became a sport of national popularity and importance.

In February 1916 the Professional Golfers Association of America (PGA) was established in New York City. One month earlier, the wealthy department store owner Rodman Wanamaker hosted a luncheon with the leading golf professionals of the day at the Wykagyl Country Club in nearby New Rochelle. The attendees prepared the agenda for the formal organization of the PGA; consequently, golf historians have dubbed Wykagyl "The Cradle of the PGA." The new organization's first president was Robert White, one of Wykagyl's best-known golf professionals.

The first PGA Championship was held in October 1916 at Siwanoy Country Club in Bronxville, New York. The winner, Jim Barnes, received $500 and a diamond-studded gold medal donated by Rodman Wanamaker. The 2016 winner, Jimmy Walker, earned $1.8 million. The champion is also awarded a replica of the Wanamaker Trophy, which was also donated by Wanamaker, to keep for one year, and a smaller-sized keeper replica Wanamaker Trophy.

Format
The PGA Championship was originally a match play event in the early fall, but it varied from May to December. After World War II, the championship was usually in late May or late June, then moved to early July in 1953 and a few weeks later in 1954, with the finals played on Tuesday. As a match play event (with a stroke play qualifier), it was not uncommon for the finalists to play over 200 holes in seven days. The 1957 event lost money, and at the PGA meetings in November it was changed to stroke play, starting in 1958, with the standard 72-hole format of 18 holes per day for four days, Thursday to Sunday. Network television broadcasters, preferring a large group of well-known contenders on the final day, pressured the PGA of America to make the format change.

During the 1960s, the PGA Championship was played the week after The Open Championship five times, making it virtually impossible for players to compete in both majors. In 1965, the PGA was contested for the first time in August, and returned in 1969, save for a one-year move to late February in 1971, played in Florida. The 2016 event was moved to late July, two weeks after the Open Championship, to accommodate the 2016 Summer Olympics in August.

Before the 2017 edition, it was announced that the PGA Championship would be moved to May on the weekend before Memorial Day, beginning in 2019. The PGA Tour concurrently announced that it would move its Players Championship back to March the same year; it had been moved from March to May in 2007. The PGA of America cited the addition of golf to the Summer Olympics, as well as cooler weather enabling a wider array of options for host courses, as reasoning for the change. It was also believed that the PGA Tour wished to re-align its season so that the FedEx Cup Playoffs would not have to compete with the start of football season in late-August.

Location
The PGA Championship has normally been played in the eastern half of the United States except eleven times, most recently in 2020 at TPC Harding Park in San Francisco. It was the first for the Bay Area, returning to California after a quarter century. Prior to 2020, it was last played in the Pacific time zone in 1998, at Sahalee east of Seattle. (The Mountain time zone has hosted three editions, all in suburban Denver, in 1941, 1967, and 1985.) The 103rd PGA Championship was held at the Kiawah Island Golf Resort's Ocean Course in Kiawah Island, South Carolina and the 104th was held at Southern Hills Country Club in Tulsa, Oklahoma.

The state of New York has hosted thirteen times, followed by Ohio (11) and Pennsylvania (9).

Promotion
The tournament was previously promoted with the slogan "Glory's Last Shot". In 2013, the tagline was dropped in favor of "The Season's Final Major", as suggested by PGA Tour commissioner Tim Finchem while discussing the allowance of a one-week break in its schedule before the Ryder Cup. Finchem had argued that the slogan was not appropriate as it weakened the stature of events that occur after it, such as the PGA Tour's FedEx Cup playoffs. PGA of America CEO Pete Bevacqua explained that they had also had discussions with CBS, adding that "it was three entities that all quickly came to the same conclusion that, you know what, there's just not much in that tag line and we don’t feel it's doing much for the PGA Championship, so let's not stick with it. Let's think what else is out there." For a time, the tournament used the slogan "This is Major" as a replacement.

Trophy
The trophy was lost, briefly, for a few years until it showed up in 1930 in the cellar of L.A. Young and Company. Ironically, this cellar was in the factory which made the clubs for the man responsible for losing it, Walter Hagen. Hagen claimed to have trusted a taxi driver with the precious cargo, but it never returned to his hotel. There is a smaller replica trophy that the champion gets to keep permanently, but the original must be returned for the following years tournament.

Qualification
The PGA Championship was established for the purpose of providing a high-profile tournament specifically for professional golfers at a time when they were generally not held in high esteem in a sport that was largely run by wealthy amateurs. This origin is still reflected in the entry system for the Championship. It is the only major that does not explicitly invite leading amateurs to compete (it is possible for amateurs to get into the field, although the only viable ways are by winning one of the other major championships, or winning a PGA Tour event while playing on a sponsor's exemption), and the only one that reserves so many places, 20 of 156, for club professionals. These slots are determined by the top finishers in the PGA Professional Championship, which is held in late April.

Since December 1968, the PGA Tour has been independent of the PGA of America.

The PGA Tour is an elite organization of tournament professionals, but the PGA Championship is still run by the PGA of America, which is mainly a body for club and teaching professionals. The PGA Championship is the only major that does not explicitly grant entry to the top 50 players in the Official World Golf Ranking, although it invariably invites all of the top 100 (not just top 50) players who are not already qualified.

List of qualification criteria to date:
Every former PGA Champion.
Winners of the last five U.S. Opens.
Winners of the last five Masters.
Winners of the last five Open Championships.
Winners of the last three The Players Championships.
The current Senior PGA Champion.
The low 15 scorers and ties in the previous PGA Championship.
The 20 low scorers in the last PGA Professional Championship.
The 70 leaders in official money standings on the PGA Tour (starting one week before the previous year's PGA Championship and ending two weeks before the current year's PGA Championship).
Members of the most recent United States and European Ryder Cup Teams, provided they are in the top 100 of the Official World Golf Ranking as of one week before the start of the tournament.
Any tournament winner co-sponsored or approved by the PGA Tour since the previous PGA Championship .
The PGA of America reserves the right to invite additional players not included in the categories listed above.
The total field is a maximum of 156 players. Vacancies are filled by the first available player from the list of alternates (those below 70th place in official money standings).

Winners

Stroke play era winners

Match play era winners

Source:

Match play era details
The table below lists the field sizes and qualification methods for the match play era. All rounds were played over 36 holes except as noted in the table.

* In 1921, the field consisted of the defending champion and the top 31 qualifiers from the 1921 U.S. Open.

Summary by course, state and region

Records
Most wins: 5, Jack Nicklaus, Walter Hagen
Most runner-up finishes: 4, Jack Nicklaus
Oldest winner: Phil Mickelson in 2021 (50 years, 11 months)
Youngest winner: Gene Sarazen in 1922 (20 years, 174 days)
Greatest winning margin in the match play era: Paul Runyan beat Sam Snead 8 & 7 in 1938
Greatest winning margin in the stroke play era: 8 strokes, Rory McIlroy in 2012
Lowest absolute 72-hole score: 264, Brooks Koepka (69-63-66-66), 2018
Lowest 72-hole score in relation to par: −20, Jason Day (68-67-66-67=268) in 2015
This is the lowest score in relation to par at any major championship.
Koepka's 2018 score was −16. The 2018 site, Bellerive Country Club, played to par 70, while the 2015 site, the Straits Course at Whistling Straits, played to par 72. (Bellerive played to par 71 when it hosted in 1992, and the Straits Course also played to par 72 when it hosted in 2004 and 2010.) 
Lowest 18-hole score: 63 – Bruce Crampton, 2nd round, 1975; Raymond Floyd, 1st, 1982; Gary Player, 2nd, 1984; Vijay Singh, 2nd, 1993; Michael Bradley, 1st, 1995; Brad Faxon, 4th, 1995; José María Olazábal, 3rd, 2000; Mark O'Meara, 2nd, 2001; Thomas Bjørn, 3rd, 2005; Tiger Woods, 2nd, 2007; Steve Stricker, 1st, 2011; Jason Dufner, 2nd, 2013; Hiroshi Iwata, 2nd, 2015; Robert Streb, 2nd, 2016; Brooks Koepka, 2nd, 2018; Charl Schwartzel, 2nd, 2018; Brooks Koepka, 1st, 2019; Bubba Watson, 2nd, 2022.
Most frequent venues:
5 PGA Championships: Southern Hills Country Club – 1970, 1982, 1994, 2007, 2022.
3 PGA Championships: Atlanta Athletic Club, Highlands Course – 1981, 2001, 2011.
3 PGA Championships: Firestone Country Club, South Course – 1960, 1966, 1975.
3 PGA Championships: Oakland Hills Country Club, South Course – 1972, 1979, 2008.
3 PGA Championships: Oakmont Country Club – 1922, 1951, 1978.
3 PGA Championships: Oak Hill Country Club, East Course – 1980, 2003, 2013, (2023 planned).
3 PGA Championships: Valhalla Golf Club – 1996, 2000, 2014, (2024 planned).
3 PGA Championships: Whistling Straits, Straits Course – 2004, 2010, 2015.

Broadcasting 

The PGA Championship is televised in the United States by CBS and ESPN. Beginning 2020, ESPN holds rights to early-round and weekend morning coverage, and will air supplemental coverage through its digital subscription service ESPN+ prior to weekday coverage and during weekend broadcast windows. CBS holds rights to weekend-afternoon coverage. Both contracts run through 2030, with ESPN's contract replacing a prior agreement with TNT. CBS has televised the PGA Championship since 1991, when it replaced ABC. The ESPN telecasts are co-produced with CBS Sports, mirroring the broadcast arrangements used by ESPN for the Masters Tournament.

Future sites

Source:

See also

Golf in the United States

Notes

References

External links

 PGA Media Guide
 Coverage on PGA Tour's official site
 Coverage on the European Tour's official site

 
Men's major golf championships
Annual sporting events in the United States
1916 establishments in New York (state)
Recurring sporting events established in 1916